Forsyth's toadhead agama (Phrynocephalus forsythii), is a species of agamid lizard endemic to China. This species was named after Sir T. Douglas Forsyth.

References

forsythii
Reptiles of China
Endemic fauna of China
Reptiles described in 1872
Taxa named by John Anderson (zoologist)